TN-07 AL 4777 is a 2009 Indian Tamil-language thriller drama film directed by A. Lakshmikanthan. The film stars Ajmal Ameer, Pasupathy, Simran and Meenakshi. The film's soundtrack, composed by Vijay Antony was released on 12 December 2008. It is a remake of the 2006 Hindi film Taxi Number 9211 which in itself was an adaptation of the American film Changing Lanes (2002). Pooja Umashankar makes a special appearance in the film.

Plot
Manikandan alias Mani (Pasupathy) is a cab driver in Chennai who lies to his wife Subbalakshmi (Simran) about his job, pretending to be an insurance salesman. One day, he gives Gautham (Ajmal Ameer), the spoilt son of a late businessman, a ride. Gautham is fighting for ownership rights of his late businessman's estate. The cab gets into an accident with Gautham's escaping as he's in hurry. Gautham loses his key to the vault containing his father's will in the back of Mani's taxi.

Mani decides to hide it from Gautham. As he in search for the key, Gautham goes to Mani's house and tells Subbalakshmi what he really does for his living which Gautham didn't know. She leaves him taking their son. Mani decides to take revenge. Mani and Gautham vow to kill each other in their fight for their properties. When Mani fails to kill Gautham he targets Gautam's girlfriend, Pooja (Meenakshi). As Mani chases Pooja she was saved by Gautham by hair's breadth. Gautham lets Pooja escape and he attack's Mani. They have a dirty car fight but both survive.

Mani goes to Gautham's place. Gautham returns to his apartment from a second court hearing regarding his father's estate in defeat, because he doesn't have his father's will torn to pieces and pasted on the wall of his apartment. Gautham becomes depressed and lonely after his friends leave him. Pooja dumps him, indicating she wanted him only for his fortune. Losing everything that used to be precious. Gautham realises the hard-hitting life and start respecting his father and his work.

On the other side, Mani is caught again by police and taken to police station where Subbalakshmi tells him his real character and problem within himself. Soon, he realises his mistake Gautham having realised the valve of close ones, then bails Mani out of jail. Mani insists they have a drink and they go to Gautham's house at one. They find out that they share the same birthday. Mani gives back his key which he had hidden in the sofa, and says that he had never destroyed it - the torn will on the wall is a fake. Mani then goes to the railway station to stop Subbalakshmi and son from leaving him, but arrives a little too late. He goes back home where he sees a birthday cake on the table. He feels that he is hallucinating, but gets a pleasant shock where he sees Subbalakshmi and son standing there, singing him a birthday song (and finds out that it was Gautham who brought them back).

Gautham confronts P.K.V Hariharan (Mohan Raman) the friend, and the custodian  property of Gautham's father. whom he tells that he has realised the value of life and do not want his father's property and takes a leave. Just as he drives out, his car collides with another car driven by a Woman (Pooja Umashankar), though initially both seem to be angry at each, later Gautam apologizes and asks for her number, promising to pay for damages. The movie ends as both smile at each other and drive away; indicating a new romantic beginning.

Cast
Pasupathy as Manikandan (Mani)
Ajmal Ameer as Gautham
Simran as Subbulakshmi Manikandan
Meenakshi as Pooja Gautham
Adithya as Advocate Seshadri
Mohan Raman as P.K.V Hariharan
Manobala as Police constable
Pooja Umashankar in a cameo appearance
Jiiva as narrator
Shobi Paulraj in a special appearance in the song "Aathichudi"
Vijay Antony in a special appearance in the song "Aathichudi"

Soundtrack
Music was composed by Vijay Antony with Aathichudi becoming a big hit of 2009.

Reception
Rediff wrote "Hop on this taxi with discretion: the meter's okay, the tyres are good but there's no trusting the man behind the steering wheel, so the ride's bound to be a bumpy at best." Behindwoods wrote "This remake of the Hindi Taxi No. 9211 is a sincere attempt by director Lakshmikanthan to stick to the original and the director has succeeded in his objective to a large extent also adding many new elements to suit the Tamil audience."

References

2009 films
Tamil remakes of Hindi films
2000s Tamil-language films
Films scored by Vijay Antony
Indian remakes of American films